The Blue Stones are a Canadian blues rock duo based in Windsor, Ontario.

History 
In August 2018, The Blue Stones signed a record contract with Entertainment One, where they subsequently announced plans to re-release their debut LP Black Holes on October 26, 2018. They subsequently toured the US with their Be My Fire Tour. In early January 2020, The Blue Stones were nominated for the 2020 Juno Award in the category of Breakthrough Group of the Year.

In early 2021, the band announced their sophomore LP "Hidden Gems," co-written and produced by Mutemath frontman Paul Meany. The ten song album was preceded by singles "Shakin' Off The Rust," "Grim," "Careless," "Let It Ride," and "Spirit." "Hidden Gems" was released on March 19, 2021. Their third album, titled Pretty Monster, was released in November 2022. It was preceded by singles "Don't Miss", "Good Ideas" and "What's It Take To Be Happy?"

Members 
 Tarek Jafar – vocals, guitar, bass, keys
 Justin Tessier – percussion, backing vocals

Discography

Studio albums 
 Black Holes (2015, re-released 2018)
 Hidden Gems (2021)
 Pretty Monster (2022)

Extended plays 
 The Blue Stones EP (2011)
 How's That Sound? (2012)

Singles

Music videos

References

External links 
 

Canadian indie rock groups
Canadian space rock musical groups
Canadian blues rock musical groups
Musical groups established in 2011
Musical groups from Windsor, Ontario
Rock music duos
Canadian musical duos
2011 establishments in Ontario
MNRK Music Group artists